Ciao! Manhattan is a 1972 American avant garde film starring Edie Sedgwick. A scripted drama in which most of the actors play themselves, it centers on a character very closely based on Sedgwick, and deals with the pain of addiction and the lure of fame.

Overview
Written and directed by John Palmer and David Weisman, Ciao! Manhattan is the semi-biographical tale of 1960s counterculture icon Edie Sedgwick. The film follows young Susan Superstar (Sedgwick) through her tumultuous party years in Manhattan as one of Warhol's Superstars.  Through actual audio recordings of Sedgwick's account of her time in Warhol's Factory in New York City, paired with clips from the original unfinished script started in 1967, Ciao! captures the complete deterioration of Sedgwick's fictional alter-ego. The striking similarities between Sedgwick and Susan's life story, especially when recounted by Sedgwick in the midst of drug-induced audio interviews, make the film's candid depiction of excess and celebrity especially haunting. The film is dedicated to the memory of Sedgwick and ends with the actual headlines announcing Sedgwick's (not Susan Superstar's) death, thus inseparably associating the fictional and the genuine figure.

Production 
Production of Ciao! Manhattan began on March 26, 1967, as a project of Factory regulars John Palmer, David Weisman, Genevieve Charbin, Chuck Wein, Bob Margouleff, Gino Piserchio, with supplemental roles and tasks fulfilled by various other hangers-on. The film originally followed the excessively hip lives of Midtown scenesters Sedgwick and fellow Warhol Superstar Paul America, as they lived life in the fast lane (literally speeding down the West Side Highway on massive amounts of amphetamine).

The project was riddled with budget problems and an unfinished, nonsensical script of debauchery, drug use and paranoia. Unreliable actors and rampant drug abuse behind the camera pushed shooting out of control as both Sedgwick and America went missing, putting production on hold. With barely any direction and no end in sight, the film's backers, Bob Margouleff's parents, lost faith in their son's project, and Palmer and Weisman were left with the fragments of an unpresentable film. To salvage these fragments, Palmer and Weisman decided to reshape the script to include the previously shot footage as flashback sequences to tell Sedgwick's tragic story through the persona of Susan Superstar.

In December 1970, they resumed filming on the dilapidated "Lucky" Baldwin estate in Arcadia, California. For a month they shot Susan recounting her past through the dazed euphoria of perpetual substance abuse. The shooting lasted only a month and in 1971, Ciao! finally went into post-production. However, the excitement of the film's near completion was short-lived due to Sedgwick's death from acute barbiturate intoxication.

Ciao! Manhattan was finally completed on May 25, 1972 and had its premiere in Amsterdam in July 1972 to critical acclaim, due in part to Sedgwick's onscreen presence and representation of a culture that she helped to define.  The successful screenings continued in London, Germany, France, San Diego, Denver, and Tempe, Arizona, but then the film essentially disappeared for nearly a decade until interest in Edie Sedgwick was sparked again by the best-selling book Edie: An American Biography by George Plimpton and Jean Stein in 1982.

30th Anniversary DVD release
In the years since its original release, Ciao! Manhattan has become a cult classic, due in large part to the film being Edie Sedgwick's last starring vehicle. On July 19, 2002, exactly thirty years after its world premiere in Amsterdam, Ciao! opened at New York's Cinema Village. In October 2002, Plexifilm released a special edition DVD with additional 35mm outtake footage, rare pictures and interviews with the cast and crew of the film.

Soundtrack

On April 22, 2017, Light in the Attic Records released the film's official soundtrack on their Cinewax imprint, for the occasion of Record Store Day. The first vinyl pressing was limited to three thousand copies, and contains the prominent songs featured in the film (by Richie Havens, John Phillips, Kim Milford, and the duo of Skip Battin and Kim Fowley), in addition to most of the incidental electronic music performed by Gino Piserchio. Prior to this release, the film's soundtrack had never been released in any form. A CD version of the soundtrack is also available.

See also
 List of American films of 1972

References
Notes

Bibliography
Stein, Jean and George Plimpton. Edie: An American Biography. New York, NY. Grove Press. 1994
Weisman, David. Girl on Fire (DVD insert). Brooklyn, NY. Plexifilm. 2002.
Wilson, Andrew. "Edie Sedgwick: the It Girl who was Inspiration to Dylan and Warhol". The Independent. London: February 5, 2006.

External links

Morley, Sheridan. Ciao! Manhattan Review. The Times. May 25, 1973.
"Weisman & Palmer Dig Amsterdam As Preem For Their 'Manhattan'". Variety. August 23, 1972.
Malcolm, Derek. Ciao! Manhattan Review. The Guardian. May 24, 1973.
Nettles, John G. Her Fog, Her Amphetamines, and Her Pearls. Popmatters. March 18, 2003.

1972 films
American drama films
American avant-garde and experimental films
American black-and-white films
Films set in New York City
Films shot in California
Films shot in Fort Lee, New Jersey
Films shot in New York City
American independent films
1970s avant-garde and experimental films
1970s English-language films
1970s American films